Marianne Micros (born 1943) is a Canadian writer. A retired professor of English at the University of Guelph, her debut short story collection Eye was shortlisted for the 2019 Danuta Gleed Literary Award, and for the Governor General's Award for English-language fiction at the 2019 Governor General's Awards.

Micros previously published two poetry collections, Upstairs Over the Ice Cream (1979) and Seventeen Trees (2007), and has had both her poetry and short fiction published in literary magazines and anthologies.

Publications
 Upstairs over the ice cream, 1979
 Al Purdy : an annotated bibliography, 1980
 The creative circus book, 1984
 Seventeen Trees, 2007
 Eye, 2018

References

1943 births
Living people
20th-century Canadian poets
20th-century Canadian short story writers
20th-century Canadian women writers
21st-century Canadian poets
21st-century Canadian short story writers
21st-century Canadian women writers
Canadian women poets
Canadian women short story writers
People from Guelph
Writers from Ontario
Academic staff of the University of Guelph